Kozinci is a village in the municipality of Gradiška, Republika Srpska, Bosnia and Herzegovina.

References

Populated places in Gradiška, Bosnia and Herzegovina